"Demons" is a song by American indie rock band The National. Written by band members Matt Berninger and Aaron Dessner, it appears as the second track on the band's sixth studio album Trouble Will Find Me and was released as the album's first single on April 15, 2013.

Charts

Personnel
Credits adapted from Trouble Will Find Me liner notes.

 Matt Berninger – lead vocals
 Aaron Dessner – guitar, keyboards, vibraphone, harmonica
 Bryce Dessner – guitar, keyboards, e-bow, orchestration 
 Bryan Devendorf – drums, percussion
 Scott Devendorf – bass guitar

Release history

References

2013 singles
2013 songs
The National (band) songs
4AD singles
Songs written by Matt Berninger
Songs written by Aaron Dessner
Song recordings produced by Aaron Dessner